Cable matcher may refer to:
 Gender changer for the coaxial cable
 Coaxial impedance matching adapter